Paul Le Tocq (born 31 December 1981) is a male badminton player from Guernsey.

Career
Le Tocq has played both for Wales in the BWF Circuit and the European Circuit, and for Guernsey in some international tournaments such as the Island Games. He also competed for Guernsey in mixed doubles at the 2006 Commonwealth Games.

Major achievements

References

External links

1981 births
Living people
Welsh male badminton players
Commonwealth Games competitors for Guernsey
Guernsey badminton players
Badminton players at the 2006 Commonwealth Games
Badminton players at the 2002 Commonwealth Games